Heeze Castle is situated in the Netherlands, south of Eindhoven. It used to be the centre of the seigneury of Heeze, Leende and Zesgehuchten, part of the Duchy of Brabant. In the Middle Ages, it was owned by the de Horne family. In the seventeenth Century Pieter Post designed a new castle, of which the first part was built in 1665. After Pieter Post died, the work was completed by his son Maurits Post.

Due to the rising costs of importing all building materials from other regions of the country, the build of the Post design was halted early and never finished. For this reason, the part of the castle that is used by the current owners was actually meant to be the servants' quarters. The biggest part of the castle was to be built behind the first courtyard.

In 1760 the castle was bought by Jan Maximiliaan van Tuyll van Serooskerken. The Van Tuyll van Serooskerken family has lived in the castle ever since.

Eymerick Castle

At the east of the building of Heeze Castle within the waters is a part of an older castle situated Eymerick Castle. This castle was already in 1659 in a bad shape. Because the building-plans of Heeze Castle were never completed this part of the old castle is still there.

See also
List of castles in the Netherlands

References 
 Kransber, D. & H. Mils, Kastelengids van Nederland, middeleeuwen, Bussem 1979
 Kalkwiek, K.A., A.I.J.M. Schellart, H.P.H. Jansen & P.W. Geudeke, Atlas van de Nederlandse kastelen, Alphen aan den Rijn 1980
 Helsdingen, H.W. van, Gids voor de Nederlandse kastelen en buitenplaatsen, Amsterdam 1966
 Tromp, H.M.J., Kijk op kastelen Amsterdam 1979

External links 

 Site of Heeze Castle

Historic house museums in the Netherlands
Castles in North Brabant
Museums in North Brabant
Rijksmonuments in North Brabant
Heeze-Leende